Peter the Great's Naval Fortress or the Tallinn-Porkkala defence station was a Russian fortification line, which aimed to block access to the Russian capital Saint Petersburg via the sea. The plans for the fortress included heavy coastal artillery pieces along the northern and southern shores of the Gulf of Finland. The emphasis was put on the defenses of the gulf's narrowest point, between Porkkala, (in current day Finland) and Tallinn, (in current day Estonia). This was a strategic point, as the two fortresses of Mäkiluoto and Naissaar were only 36 kilometers apart. The coastal artillery had a range of about 25 kilometers and could thus "close" the gap between the shores, trapping enemy ships in a crossfire. Furthermore, a new major naval base was constructed in Tallinn.

Purpose

The decision to start construction of the naval fortress line came after the disastrous events at Tsushima, where the whole Russian Baltic Fleet had been annihilated. The road to Saint Petersburg was then unprotected and open. The quickest and cheapest way of dealing with this problem was to protect Saint Petersburg with a seemingly impenetrable zone of coastal artillery until a new fleet had been constructed. The idea was presented for the first time in 1907. Czar Nicholas II approved the plans on July 5, 1912, and the construction began soon thereafter.

Defensive lines
The system consisted of several zones of defence:
 The innermost zone consisted of the fortresses at Kronstadt, Krasnaya Gorka and Ino, and the land and coastal fortresses near Vyborg. The latter were to prevent the enemy circling the Kronstadt line by landing near the Bay of Vyborg.
 The second line was between Kotka and Narva, following the between-lying islands.
 The third and main line of defence was between Tallinn and Porkkala.
 The fourth line was between Hiiumaa and the Hanko Peninsula.

Further, Helsinki and Tallinn were encircled with defensive lines on land, consisting of thousands of kilometers of railway, bunkers connected with tunnel systems, and cannon fire positions. The fortification around Helsinki, Krepost Sveaborg, was centered on the old fortress of Suomenlinna.

The construction of the defensive system was slowed due to the outbreak of World War I. The naval fortress was only partly finished when both Finland and Estonia declared their independence, following the Russian October revolution. The German Navy performed one major landing operation on the shores of the Gulf of Finland during World War I. In April 1918, following a request from the Senate of Vaasa in Finland, the German Ostsee Division, led by Rüdiger von der Goltz, landed in Hankoo, joined the Finnish Whites in the fight against the Reds, and conquered Helsinki.

The heavy batteries of the Tallinn-Porkkala line

The heaviest batteries were supposed to consist of 356 mm/52 m 1913 guns. However, at the time of the Russian revolution of 1917, these were still under construction and were not finished.

Mäkiluoto: 
4x 203 mm/50 VC
Naissaar: 
4x 305 mm/52 O
4x 234 mm/50 Be
4x 203 mm/50 VC
4x 152 mm/45 C
3x 120 mm/50 V
Aegna:
2x 305/52 O
Viimsi
4x 120/50 V
Suurupi:
4x 234/50 Be
Kakumägi
3x 120/50 V

Aftermath
In the 1930s, the Finnish and Estonian coastal defenses made extensive plans to use the fortresses against their former masters, and prevent the Soviet Baltic Fleet from gaining access to the seas. The defense would be strengthened by minefields and patrolling submarines from the Finnish and Estonian navies. These plans were however nullified with the Soviet demands of air and naval bases in the Baltic States in 1939.

The fortress in Porkkala, along with its 305 mm guns was leased to the Soviet Union in the Moscow Armistice of 1944. When the territory was returned to Finland in 1956, the guns were demolished.

See also 
 Finnish–Estonian defense cooperation

References

Sources

External links 
 Krepost Sveaborg - Land and Sea Fortress of Helsinki During the First World War
 Interactive map (incomplete)

Documentary Film
 Legend Of The Fort - Upcoming documentary film about Naval Fortress Of Emperor Peter The Great

Military history of Russia
Forts in Finland
Forts in Estonia
Forts in Russia
Coastal artillery
Coastal fortifications